Joaquín García Paredes, nicknamed Nito (born 8 November 1933) is a Spanish former professional footballer who played as a forward.

Career
Born in Guardamar del Segura, Nito played for Real Murcia, Levante and Villarrobledo. His younger brother Fernando, also known as "Nito", was also a footballer.

References

1933 births
Living people
Spanish footballers
Real Murcia players
Levante UD footballers
CD Villarrobledo players
Segunda División players
Association football forwards
People from Vega Baja del Segura
Sportspeople from the Province of Alicante